
The Henry Wilson Shoe Shop is an historic "ten footer" building located at 181 West Central Street, Route 135 in Natick, Massachusetts, USA. Built in the 1850s, it was the shoe shop of Henry Wilson, a Senator from Massachusetts and the eighteenth Vice President of the United States. On July 24, 2000, it was listed in the National Register of Historic Places.

A ten footer is a small backyard shop structure that was built in the 18th and 19th centuries in New England to serve as a shoemaker's shop. The ten footers were forerunners of the large shoe factories that developed in New England later in the 19th century.

See also
 National Register of Historic Places listings in Middlesex County, Massachusetts

Notes

Sources
 Hunter, Ethel A., The Ten-Footers of New England in Parks, Roger, editor, The New England Galaxy: The best of 20 years from Old Sturbridge Village, Chester Connecticut: Globe Pequot Press, 1980, pp. 134–139,

External links

 Boston Marathon mile 8.5
 Natick Walking Tour listing
 Natick Historical Society page
 Library of Congress Historic American Buildings resources

Commercial buildings on the National Register of Historic Places in Massachusetts
Buildings and structures in Natick, Massachusetts
Shoemakers
Retail buildings in Massachusetts
National Register of Historic Places in Middlesex County, Massachusetts
Commercial buildings completed in the 19th century
1850s establishments in Massachusetts